The title Hero of the Soviet Union was bestowed upon citizens who showed bravery in battle. Dozens of people awarded the title were from ethnic groups deemed "traitorous" by Stalin, and despite their loyalty and service they were usually deported to exile after their military service. In several instances, the partially rehabilitated children of exiled parents were awarded the title for feats in Afghanistan and for other services to the Soviet state. In some of the listed cases, the recipient's award nomination filled out by their commander would list a "safe" nationality, different from what was listed as their race on their internal passports as determined by their parent's nationality for obvious reasons.

Recipients

Balkar
 Alim Baisultanov
 Mukhazhir Ummayev ru

Chechen
 Irbaykhan Baybulatov
 Khansultan Dachiev
 Abukhadzhi Idrisov
 Khanpasha Nuradilov
 Khavazi Muhamed-Mirzaev
 Movlid Visaitov

Crimean Tatar
 Amet-khan Sultan (twice)
 Uzeir Abduramanov
 Teyfuq Abdul
 Fetislyam Abilov
 Abdraim Reshidov
 Seyitnafe Seyitveliyev

Ingush
 Ruslan Aushev

Kalmyk
 Erentsen Badmayev ru
 Bator Basanov ru
 Basan Gorodovikov ru
 Oka Gorodovikov
 Erdin Delikov ru
 Lidzhi Mandzhiyev ru
 Valery Ochirov ru
 Nikolai Sandzhirov ru
 Mikhail Selgikov ru
 Bimbel Khecheyev ru

Karachay
 Kharun Bogatyryov
 Osman Kasayev
 Khalmurze Kumukov ru

Korean
 Yevgeny Kim
 Aleksandr Min

Meskhetian Turk
 Bedir Muradov ru

See also
 Deportation of the Crimean Tatars
 Deportation of the Chechens and Ingush
 Deportation of the Kalmyks
 Deportation of the Karachays
 Deportation of the Balkars
 Deportation of the Koreans
 Deportation of the Meskhetian Turks

References 

 
 Russian Ministry of Defence Database «Подвиг Народа в Великой Отечественной войне 1941—1945 гг.» [Feat of the People in the Great Patriotic War 1941-1945] (in Russian).

Heroes of the Soviet Union lists